"Holiday" is a song  by American singer Madonna from her eponymous debut album, Madonna (1983). Sire Records released it as the album's third single on September 7, 1983. Written by Curtis Hudson and Lisa Stevens of Pure Energy, the track was offered to Madonna by her producer John "Jellybean" Benitez when she was looking for a potential hit track to include on her debut album. After accepting the song, she and Benitez worked on it and altered its composition by the addition of a piano solo performed by their friend, Fred Zarr. "Holiday" features instrumentation from guitars, electronic handclaps, a cowbell, and a synthesized string arrangement, while its lyrics speak about the universal sentiment of taking a holiday.

Receiving highly positive reviews from critics, the song became Madonna's first mainstream hit single in the United States, peaking at number 16 on the Billboard Hot 100 and number one on the Dance Club Songs chart. It also became her first top-ten single in several countries, including Australia, Belgium, West Germany, Ireland, the Netherlands and the United Kingdom. Madonna has performed "Holiday" on most of her tours and it is generally included as a part of the encore. Different performances of the song are included in the recorded releases of her tours. "Holiday" has been covered by several artists and appeared in multiple television shows. In 2003, Q Magazine ranked "Holiday" number 88 in their list of the "1001 Best Songs Ever".

Background and writing
In 1983, 25-year-old Madonna was recording her eponymous debut album with Warner Bros. Records producer Reggie Lucas, after Sire Records green-lit it when her first single "Everybody" became a club hit. However, she did not have enough material for the album. Lucas brought two new songs to the project and John "Jellybean" Benitez, a DJ at Funhouse disco was called to remix the available tracks. In the meantime due to a conflict of interest, Madonna's collaborator on "Everybody", Stephen Bray had sold a song "Ain't No Big Deal" to an act called Barracuda on another label, rendering it unavailable for Madonna's album. It was Benitez who discovered a new song written by Curtis Hudson and Lisa Stevens of the pop group Pure Energy. The song, titled "Holiday", had been turned down by singers Phyllis Hyman and Mary Wilson, formerly of The Supremes. Hudson and Stevens were asked by Benitez if they had any song for then-unknown Madonna and since their record label Prism did not want to release "Holiday", they gave it to Benitez. Pure Energy recalled in an interview with Blogcritics:
We knew that the song had that magic to it. Since we weren't going to be able to record ["Holiday"] ourselves, we were really hoping it would fall into the hands of someone who was going to do it justice. Jellybean was shopping it, and I think he pitched it to Phyllis Hyman and a couple of other artists. We didn't pitch the songs that much. I was still hoping we could come around to Pure Energy recording it.
Stevens remembered that she had started playing the beginning chords of "Holiday" on a keyboard but could not progress further. Hudson, who felt that the music could lead to something constructive, urged Stevens to experiment with it for a week and ultimately came up with the hook "Holiday, Celebrate!", while going back-and-forth between them. Inspired by the opening chords and hearing depressing news on the radio, Hudson started penning down the song and within 30 minutes was able to complete it, with the whole composition and arrangement in his mind. Most of the song was written by him with Stevens suggesting few alterations like the line "It would be so nice".

Recording and composition
Benitez and Madonna sent the demo to their friend, Fred Zarr so he could change the arrangement and program it differently. After the vocals were added by Madonna, Benitez spent four days and tried to enhance the commercial appeal of the track before the April 1983 deadline set by Madonna's record label. Benitez had not produced any song at that time but was aware of how to reconstruct the different musical pieces in a studio. He composed the sound, assembled the musicians and hummed the tune to them for recording. He also asked Madonna to sing in a "soulful" manner on the track. Just before it was completed, Madonna and Benitez met Zarr at Sigma Sound Studios in Manhattan where the track was recorded. The singer suggested Zarr to add a piano solo towards the end of the track, as well as asked Hudson to change a part of the funk in the guitar rhythm.

Pure Energy, who were also present at the recording studio during February 1983, recalled that the rhythm track was finished in a single day because they did not want to venture further from the demo track. Minor changes were included, like substituting Hudson's LinnDrum with Zarr's Oberheim DMX. Other changes were in the vocal delivery from the soul, gospel like singing on the demo to Madonna's "poppier" belting; she still remained true to the original melody of the track. The group was not given a production credit on "Holiday" since Benitez had presented the track to Sire Records, and he had an existing relationship with Madonna. Although Hudson pressed for a credit, they ultimately let it go since they felt that the song would be their chance to get recognized as efficient songwriters.

Musically, "Holiday" is a dance-pop and post-disco song devoid of any particular structure. It begins with a chord sequence similar to Cyndi Lauper's later "Time After Time" (1984). Set in the time signature of common time with a medium tempo of 116 beats per minute, the song is composed in the key of D major and is six minutes seven seconds in length. Madonna's vocal range spans from B3 to C5. The track follows in the chord progression of G–A–Bm in the first line, when Madonna sings "Holiday!" and changes to G–A–Fm–G in the second line, when Madonna sings "Celebrate!".

The four bar sequence of the progression continues throughout the song and features instrumentation from guitars flicking in the background, electronic handclaps, cowbell played by Madonna, and a synthesized string arrangement. A side-by-side repetitive progression is achieved by making use of the chorus. Towards the end of the song, a change in the arrangement happens, where a piano break is heard. Lyrically the song expresses the universal sentiment that everybody needs a holiday from their daily lives. Along with Benitez's production and Zarr's instrumentation, other personnel working on "Holiday" included Raymond Hudson on bass, Bashiri Johnson on percussion and Tina B. and Norma Jean Wright who provided background vocals.

Release details
Initially it was decided that "Lucky Star" would be released as a single; instead "Holiday" was released in the United States when the latter was picked up by radios for airplay and became a dance hit. Warner Bros. Records were not prepared for the song to take off like that and hence no music video was released for it. The original British cover art for "Holiday" did not carry Madonna's picture since Sire did not want the British people to find out that she was not a R&B artist. Instead it carried the picture of a train station and an engine. "Holiday" was later remixed in dub and groove versions for the 1987 remix album, You Can Dance. It also appeared in her first greatest hits compilation, The Immaculate Collection, in a remixed and shortened form.

In the United Kingdom, "Holiday" has been released three times as a single: in January 1984, reaching number six; reissued in August 1985, reaching number two (only being kept from number one by her own "Into the Groove" single); and re-released with new artwork in 1991 to promote The Immaculate Collection with a limited edition EP titled The Holiday Collection, which contained tracks omitted from the compilation; this version reached number five. Although the song was released to promote the greatest hits collection, it did not include the shorter remix from the album, instead it included the original album version from Madonna (1983). The photography used for the 1991 release was by Steven Meisel and had previously been used for the February 1991 cover for Vogue Italia.
It has been featured in Wii dance video game Just Dance 2 .

Critical reception

The song received critical acclaim. Author Rikky Rooksby in his book The Complete Guide to the Music of Madonna commented that "'Holiday' was as infectious as the plague. One listen and you could not get the damn hook out of your mind." He also likened the track as getting on a carousel and either enjoying the ride, or getting really bothered by the song going "on-and-on" for six minutes. Jim Farber of Entertainment Weekly commented that "Holiday" satisfied the musical ear of both the sides of the Atlantic. While reviewing The Immaculate Collection album, David Browne from Entertainment Weekly commented that "Holiday" was a "spunky dance-beat trifle". He also complimented the song's expert production.

Mary Cross in her biography of Madonna, described "Holiday" as "a simple song with a fresh appeal and a good mood." According to author Lucy O'Brien, who wrote in the biography Madonna: Like an Icon, the track was an example of Madonna's early musical endeavors being about the "power of dance". She believed that the song cemented her style of music with its "bubbling Latin undertow, crunchy bass and strings and Fred Zarr's elegant closing piano riff". O'Brien declared "Holiday" as Madonna's "most" persuasive dance song with its "tension, release, resolution and celebratory" nature enhanced by Madonna's "playful commands and exhortations". Sal Cinquemani of Slant Magazine described the song as airy. Stephen Thomas Erlewine from AllMusic called it effervescent and one of the great songs of the Madonna album. While reviewing The Immaculate Collection, he called it one of her greatest hits. Don Shewey of Rolling Stone commented that the simple lyrics of the song sound clever.

Commercial performance

"Holiday" was released on September 7, 1983, and became Madonna's first hit single in the United States and remained on the charts from Thanksgiving to Christmas 1983. It was Madonna's first song to enter the Billboard Hot 100, at 88 on the issue dated October 29, 1983. and reached a peak of 16 on January 28, 1984 and was on the chart for 21 weeks. The song debuted at eight on the Hot Dance Club Play chart on the issue dated November 2, 1983 and was Madonna's first number one single on the Hot Dance Club Play chart remaining at the top for five weeks. The song also made an entry in the Hot R&B/Hip-Hop Songs chart and peaked at 25, remaining on the chart for 20 weeks. In Canada, the song debuted at number 48 position of the RPM singles chart on January 21, 1984 and peaked at number 39. The song again entered the chart at number 45 in March 1984, and peaked at number 32 in April 1984. It was present on the chart for a total of 12 weeks.

In the United Kingdom, "Holiday" was released in 1984 whence it charted and reached a peak of six on the chart. However, a rerelease in 1985 with "Think of Me" on the B-side, saw the song enter the charts at number 32 and reached a new peak of two on the chart, being held off the number one spot by Madonna's own "Into the Groove", while being present for ten weeks. Another re-release in 1991 saw the song reach a peak of five on the chart. The song was certified gold by the British Phonographic Industry (BPI) in August 1985, and according to the Official Charts Company, "Holiday" has sold 878,000 copies there as of August 2018. Across Europe, the song reached the top ten of Belgium, Netherlands, West Germany and Ireland while reaching the top 40 in France, Sweden and Switzerland. According to Music & Media magazine the song had sold around 1.5 million copies in Europe by September 1985. In Australia, "Holiday" entered the Top 50 of the Kent Music Report in April 1984 and reached number 4, spending 16 weeks on chart. The song debuted at number 37 on the New Zealand Singles Chart, making it Madonna's debut chart appearance in the country. It peaked at number seven.

During a 2005 interview with Harry Smith of CBS News, Madonna singled out "Holiday" as a favorite amongst her top-ten charting singles, though Smith corrected that it had peaked at a much lower position. Pure Energy remembered that the success of "Holiday" also helped them financially, the royalties helping them move out of the boarding house they had been living. Hudson confirmed that the song still generated money for them, saying that "Can you live off of one hit? Yes, you can if you get the right hit. It can last you a lifetime. We've been living proof of that". However, the band were not able to replicate their songwriting success of "Holiday" with later releases, since the music business still expected them to concoct something like the track.

Live performances
Madonna has performed "Holiday" on almost all of her tours, namely The Virgin Tour, Who's That Girl, Blond Ambition, The Girlie Show, Drowned World, Re-Invention, Sticky & Sweet Tour and Rebel Heart Tour. In 1984, Madonna performed Holiday on the hit dance show American Bandstand with Dick Clark. Madonna then added it to the set list of her 1985 Virgin Tour. It was performed as the second song of the tour. The same year she performed the song at the Live Aid benefit concert in Philadelphia in July.

The Who's That Girl World Tour in 1987 had Madonna performing "Holiday" as the last song of the tour. Madonna performed an energetic version of the song, signalling the celebratory and wholesome nature of the song's theme. She sang the final chorus twice, and on some dates asked the audience for a comb so that she could fix her hair and finished the performance. Two different performances are found in Ciao Italia: Live from Italy tour video filmed at Stadio Communale in Turin, Italy on September 4, 1987 and the Who's That Girl: Live in Japan tour video filmed at Korakuen Stadium in Tokyo, Japan on June 22, 1987.

For the Blond Ambition World Tour in 1990, Madonna said, "I wanted to throw an old song for fun, and 'Holiday' seemed to be a universal favourite. In addition to that it's one of the only old songs I've done that I can still sing and not feel I've totally outgrown it." Performing it as a part of the encore, Madonna appeared on the stage in a polka-dotted blouse with matching flounces at the bottom of white trousers and hair in a top knot with a ponytail. The costume was adopted from a My Fair Lady dress and was designed by Jean-Paul Gaultier. Three different performances are found in the Blond Ambition: Japan Tour 90 VHS, the Blond Ambition World Tour Live VHS and the Truth or Dare documentary. The performance included in the documentary was used as a music video to promote it. The performance received four nominations at the 1992 MTV Video Music Awards, including Best Female Video, Best Dance Video, Best Choreography in Video and Best Cinematography in Video, but did not win any of the categories.

In The Girlie Show in 1993, the song was performed in an alternate version as the second-to-last song of the tour. It had a military theme to it. Halfway through the performance Madonna paused the song for a military drill with the dancers and the audience. The performance met with strong reaction in Puerto Rico, when Madonna rubbed the Puerto Rican national flag between her legs in between the performance. For the Drowned World Tour in 2001 Madonna wore a fur coat, velvet fedora and a customised Dolce & Gabbana T-shirt which proclaimed 'Mother' in the front and 'F*cker' in the back painted in silver. This demonstrated her ghetto-girl appearance adopted for the song's performance.

In the Re-Invention Tour in 2004, the song was again performed as the ending song of the tour. The song was given a tribal feeling with Madonna wearing Scottish kilts during the performance. The performance started with Madonna and her dancers doing a dance routine in front of the stage, then Madonna going on the revolving tiers of the stage to sing the song as confetti fell from above. The performance was included in the I'm Going to Tell You a Secret live album and documentary. Stephen Thomas Erlewine of Allmusic commented that the performance "feels like they could fit the Eurotrash, campy retro-disco feel of Confessions."

The song was added to the 2009 leg of her Sticky & Sweet Tour. It replaced the song "Heartbeat" from Hard Candy and was used as a tribute to singer Michael Jackson who died a week prior to the start of the second leg of the tour. As Madonna sang the song, a picture of a young Jackson appeared on stage, followed by a Jackson impersonator wearing garments in Jackson style. The music then switched to a medley of his songs, like "Billie Jean" and "Wanna Be Startin' Somethin'", and the impersonator worked through his moves, including the moonwalk as well as the spinning and gyrating. Madonna clapped her hands, swayed from side to side and jumped up and down while images of Jackson over the years flashed on a big screen. After the performance, Madonna told the crowd, "Let's give it up for one of the greatest artists the world has ever known," and the crowd applauded.

In 2012, Madonna performed "Holiday" on some shows of The MDNA Tour. The song was the closing number to Madonna's Rebel Heart Tour in 2015–2016; it included an excerpt from Bob James' cover of "Take Me to the Mardi Gras". She performed the song while she was wrapped with the country's flag. She exited from the stage while she was levitated by a harness and rope. The performance was included in the live album Rebel Heart Tour recorded in Sydney, Australia, and released in September 2017.

Covers and media appearance

British synthpop band Heaven 17 recorded a cover for the 1999 compilation, Virgin Voices Vol. 1: A Tribute To Madonna. In 2002, Mad'House recorded a Club cover of the song for their album Absolutely Mad. Girl Authority covered the song in 2007 for their album, Road Trip. In 1986, Dutch rap duo MC Miker G & DJ Sven released "Holiday Rap", a song which sampled the tune and chorus of Madonna's "Holiday". It achieved commercial success by peaking the charts in countries like France, Netherlands and Switzerland and going the top ten of Austria, Norway, Britain and Sweden. The bassline of the song was sampled by The Avalanches for their 2000 album Since I Left You. It was used on the songs "Stay Another Season" and "Little Journey".

The song was redone by the Will & Grace cast as "He's Hot" for the sitcom's soundtrack in 2004 and even includes vocal samples from Madonna herself. Almost all of the instrumental part of the song "He's Hot!" uses samples from the original song. The Canadian teen drama Degrassi: The Next Generation, which is known for naming each episode after an 80s hit song, named a two-part episode after "Holiday". In 2006, critics noted strong similarity between "Holiday" and American singer Jessica Simpson's single "A Public Affair". Regarding the comparison, Simpson told MTV: "I think people are ready to hear something that Madonna used to do. We all need to hear that every now and again. It wasn't a sample or something I meant to do, but she did influence me and still does today." In 2008, "Holiday" appeared on the video game Karaoke Revolution Presents: American Idol Encore. Kelis often performs a mashup of her own hit "Milkshake" with "Holiday" live. In 2003, a snippet of the song appeared in the film Rugrats Go Wild, when the families went on their cruise. A covered version of the song appears in the 2010 video game Just Dance 2.

Track listing and formats

 US 7-inch single
 "Holiday" (7-inch edit) – 4:10
 "I Know It" (LP version) – 3:45

 European 12-inch single
 "Holiday" (LP version) – 6:07
 "I Know It" (LP version) – 3:45

 UK 7-inch single
 "Holiday" (7-inch edit) – 4:10
 "Think of Me" (LP version) – 4:55

 UK 12-inch single
 "Holiday" (LP version) – 6:07
 "Think of Me" (LP version) – 4:53

 UK 7-inch, 12-inch picture disc, and cassette single (1991)
 "Holiday" (7-inch edit) – 4:10
 "True Blue" (LP version) – 4:17

 UK 12-inch single (1991)
 "Holiday" (LP version) – 6:09
 "Where's the Party" (You Can Dance remix edit) – 4:22
 "Everybody" (You Can Dance remix edit) – 4:57

 UK cassette and The Holiday Collection (1991)
 "Holiday" (LP version) – 6:09
 "True Blue" (LP version) – 4:17
 "Who's That Girl" (LP version) – 3:58
 "Causing a Commotion" (Silver Screen single mix) – 4:06

 Germany 12-inch and CD single; UK CD single (1995)
 "Holiday" (LP version) – 6:07
 "Lucky Star" (LP version) – 5:37

Credits and personnel
Credits are adapted from the album's liner notes.
 Madonna – vocals, cowbell
 Curtis Hudson – songwriter, guitar
 Lisa Stevens – songwriter
 John "Jellybean" Benitez – producer
 Fred Zarr – drum programming, moog bass, synthesizer, acoustic piano
 Raymond Hudson – bass
 Bashiri Johnson – percussion
 Tina B. – background vocals
 Norma Jean Wright – background vocals

Charts

Weekly charts

Year-end charts

Certifications and sales

See also
 List of number-one dance singles of 1983 (U.S.)
 List of UK top 10 singles in 1985

References

Bibliography

External links
 
 

Holiday songs
1983 singles
1983 songs
Madonna songs
Sire Records singles
Warner Records singles
Song recordings produced by John Benitez
Post-disco songs